Ayumi Hamasaki Arena Tour 2012 A: Hotel Love Songs is Japanese pop singer Ayumi Hamasaki's 34rd live DVD/Blu-ray release of the tour of the same name. It started on April 7, 2012 at Saitama Super Arena, ending with additional performances on October 11, 2012 at Yoyogi National Gymnasium.

Track list 
From Mantanweb.
"Happening Here"
"Song 4 U"
"Feedback" (Interlude)
"Tell Me Why"
"Reminds Me"
"Appears"
"Missing"
"A Cup of Tea"
"Shake It"
"Step You"
"NaNaNa"
"Sparkle"
"The Next Love"
"Eyes, Smoke, Magic"
"Kiss o' Kill"
"Serenade in A Minor"
"Ladies Night"
"Party Queen"
"Surreal" – "Evolution" – "Surreal"
"Love Song"
Encore
"One Night Carnival"
"Boys & Girls"
"How Beautiful You Are"
"Thank U"

References 

Ayumi Hamasaki video albums
Live video albums